Oxylaena is a genus of flowering plants in the pussy's-toes tribe within the sunflower family.

Species
The only known species is Oxylaena acicularis, native to South Africa.

References

Gnaphalieae
Endemic flora of South Africa
Monotypic Asteraceae genera